The Tennyson d'Eyncourt Baronetcy, of Carter's Corner Farm in the Parish of Herstmonceux in the County of Sussex, is a title in the Baronetage of the United Kingdom. It was created on 3 February 1930 for the naval architect Eustace Tennyson d'Eyncourt. He was a grandson of Charles Tennyson d'Eyncourt.

Another member of the Tennyson family was poet Alfred Tennyson, 1st Baron Tennyson. He was the nephew of Charles Tennyson d'Eyncourt.

Tennyson d'Eyncourt baronets, of Carter's Corner Farm (1930)
 Sir Eustace Henry William Tennyson d'Eyncourt, 1st Baronet (1868–1951)
 Sir Eustace Gervais Tennyson d'Eyncourt, 2nd Baronet (1902–1971)
 Sir John Jeremy Eustace Tennyson d'Eyncourt, 3rd Baronet (1927–1988)
 Sir Giles Gervais Tennyson d'Eyncourt, 4th Baronet (1935–1989)
 Sir Mark Gervais Tennyson d'Eyncourt, 5th Baronet (born 1967)

There is no heir to the baronetcy.

See also
Baron Tennyson

Notes

References
Kidd, Charles, Williamson, David (editors). Debrett's Peerage and Baronetage (1990 edition). New York: St Martin's Press, 1990, 

Baronetcies in the Baronetage of the United Kingdom